The Eastern Iranian languages are a subgroup of the Iranian languages emerging in Middle Iranian times (from c. the 4th century BC). The Avestan language is often classified as early Eastern Iranian. As opposed to the Middle Western Iranian dialects, the Middle Eastern Iranian preserves word-final syllables.

The largest living Eastern Iranian language is Pashto, with some 40-60 million speakers between the Oxus River in Afghanistan and the Indus River in Pakistan. The second-largest language is Ossetic with roughly 600,000 speakers. All other languages have fewer than 200,000 speakers combined.

Most living Eastern Iranian languages are spoken in a contiguous area, in southern and eastern Afghanistan as well as the adjacent parts of western Pakistan, Gorno-Badakhshan Autonomous Province of eastern Tajikistan, and the far west of Xinjiang region of China.  There are also two living members in widely separated areas: the Yaghnobi language of northwestern Tajikistan (descended from Sogdian), and the Ossetic language of the Caucasus (descended from Scytho-Sarmatian). These are remnants of a vast ethno-linguistic continuum that stretched over most of Central Asia, Eastern Europe, and parts of the Caucasus, and West Asia in the 1st millennium BC, otherwise known as Scythia. The large Eastern Iranian continuum in Eastern Europe would continue up to including the 4th century AD, with the successors of the Scythians, namely the Sarmatians.

History
Western Iranian is thought to have separated from Proto-Iranian in the course of the later 2nd millennium BC not long after Avestan, possibly occurring in the Yaz culture. Eastern Iranian followed suit, and developed in place of Proto-Iranian, spoken within the Andronovo horizon.

With Greek presence in Central Asia, some of the easternmost of these languages were recorded in their Middle Iranian stage (hence the "Eastern" classification), while almost no records of the Scytho-Sarmatian continuum stretching from Kazakhstan west across the Pontic steppe to Ukraine have survived. Some authors find that the Eastern Iranian people had an influence on Russian folk culture.

Middle Persian/Dari spread around the Oxus River region, Afghanistan, and Khorasan after the Arab conquests and during Islamic-Arab rule. The replacement of the Pahlavi script with the Arabic script in order to write the Persian language was done by the Tahirids in 9th century  Khorasan. The Persian Dari language spread and led to the extinction of Eastern Iranic languages like Bactrian and Khorezmian, with only a tiny amount of Sogdian descended Yaghnobi speakers remaining among the now Persian speaking Tajik population of Central Asia, due to the fact that the Arab-Islamic army which invaded Central Asia also included some Persians who later governed the region like the Samanids. Persian was rooted into Central Asia by the Samanids.

Classification
Eastern Iranian remains in large part a dialect continuum subject to common innovation. Traditional branches, such as "Northeastern", as well as Eastern Iranian itself, are better considered language areas rather than genetic groups.

The languages are as follows:

Old Iranian period
Northeast: Scythian, Old Saka,† etc.
Central Iranian: Avestan† (c. 1000 – 7th century BC) 
Avestan is sometimes classified as Eastern Iranian, but is not assigned to a branch in recent classifications.

Middle Iranian period
 Bactrian†, c. 4th century BC – 9th century AD
 Khwarezmian† (Chorasmian) c. 4th century BC – 13th century AD
 Sogdian†, from c. the 4th century AD
 Scytho-Khotanese (Saka)† (c. 5th century – 10th century AD) and Tumshuqese† (formerly Maralbashi, 7th century AD)
 Scytho-Sarmatian†, from c. the 8th century BC

Modern languages (Neo-Iranian)
 Pashto (dialects: Northern, Southern, Central, and others)
 Wanetsi

 Pamir languages
 North Pamir
 Old Wanji (Vanji)†
 Yazgulami
 Shughni 
 Shughni proper
 Oroshori 
 Roshani
 Khufi
 Bartangi
 Sarikoli
 Sanglechi-Ishkashimi 
 Sanglechi 
 Ishkashimi 
 Zebaki
 Wakhi

 Munji-Yidgha
 Munji
 Yidgha

 Ormuri-Parachi
 Ormuri
 Parachi

 Northern 
Yaghnobi
 Ossetian (dialects: Iron, Digor, Jassic†)

Characteristics
The Eastern Iranian area has been affected by widespread sound changes, e.g. t͡ʃ > ts.

 The initial syllable was in this word lost entirely in Yaghnobi due to a stress shift.

Lenition of voiced stops
Common to most Eastern Iranian languages is a particularly widespread lenition of the voiced stops *b, *d, *g. Between vowels, these have been lenited also in most Western Iranian languages, but in Eastern Iranian, spirantization also generally occurs in the word-initial position. This phenomenon is however not apparent in Avestan, and remains absent from Ormuri-Parachi.

A series of spirant consonants can be assumed to have been the first stage: *b > *β, *d > *ð, *g > *ɣ. The voiced velar fricative  has mostly been preserved. The labial member has been well-preserved too, but in most languages has shifted from a voiced bilabial fricative  to the voiced labiodental fricative . The dental member has proved the most unstable: while a voiced dental fricative  is preserved in some Pamir languages, it has in e.g. On the other hand, in Yaghnobi and Ossetian, the development appears to have been reversed, leading to the reappearance of a voiced stop . (Both languages have also shifted earlier *θ > .)

The consonant clusters *ft and *xt have also been widely lenited, though again excluding Ormuri-Parachi, and possibly Yaghnobi.

External influences
The neighboring Indo-Aryan languages have exerted a pervasive external influence on the closest neighbouring Eastern Iranian, as it is evident in the development in the retroflex consonants (in Pashto, Wakhi, Sanglechi, Khotanese, etc.) and aspirates (in Khotanese, Parachi and Ormuri). A more localized sound change is the backing of the former retroflex fricative ṣ̌ , to x̌  or to x , found in the Shughni–Yazgulyam branch and certain dialects of Pashto. E.g.

Notes
  Munji dā is a borrowing from Persian but Yidgha still uses los.
  Ormuri marzā has a different etymological origin, but generally Ormuri [b] is preserved unchanged, e.g. *bastra- > bēš, Ormuri for "cord" (cf. Avestan band- "to tie").
  Ossetic ærvad means "relative". The word for "brother" æfsymær is of a different etymological source.

See also
 Western Iranian languages
 Dari (Eastern Persian), a dialect of a Western Iranian language, despite the name
 Sakan language

References

External links
 Compendium Linguarum Iranicarum, ed. Schmitt (1989), p. 100.